Jefferson Township is a township in Geary County, Kansas, USA.  As of the 2000 census, its population was 1,651.

History
Jefferson Township was established in 1878. It was named for Thomas Jefferson.

Geography
According to the USGS, it contains two cemeteries: Fairview and Rosey.

Whiskey Lake is within this township. The streams of Clarks Creek, Davis Creek, Dry Creek, Franks Creek and Humboldt Creek run through this township.

Transportation
Jefferson Township contains one airport or landing strip, Marshall Airfield.

References

 USGS Geographic Names Information System (GNIS)

Further reading

External links
 City-Data.com

Townships in Geary County, Kansas
Townships in Kansas